Loutre Slough is a stream located in southeastern Montgomery and southwestern Warren counties in the U.S. state of Missouri. It is a tributary of the Missouri River.

The waterway lies within the Missouri River Valley. The waterway is interrupted by the dikes along the Loutre River south of McKittrick. The stream crosses under Missouri Route 19 south of McKittrick and runs semi-parallel to Missouri Route 94 past the community of Case where it is joined by the waters of Massie Creek.

Loutre is a name derived from the French meaning "otter".

See also
List of rivers of Missouri

References

Rivers of Montgomery County, Missouri
Rivers of Warren County, Missouri
Rivers of Missouri